Alice Hyatt (born Alice Graham in the movie; Alice Spivak in the television series)  is a fictional character in the movie Alice Doesn't Live Here Anymore and in the subsequent television series Alice. In the movie, she was played by Ellen Burstyn, who won an Academy Award for the role. In the television series, Alice was played by actress and singer Linda Lavin.

Character biography

1974 film
Alice was born and raised in Monterey, California. While still young, she marries truck driver Donald Hyatt (Billy Green Bush), whom did not.want his wife being a singer at a nightclub. She moved to his home town of Socorro, New Mexico where she is a stay at home housewife who is constantly trying to please her husband who is miserable. They have a son, Tommy (Alfred Lutter). Some time later, Don dies in a trucking accident. Now a widow with a 12-year-old son to care for, she sets off for Monterey, California but she stops in Phoenix, Arizona to find a.job to make money to get to Monterey. As they only have $90 to survive on.  She rents a motel with a kitchen, and finds a job as a singer at a piano bar, where she meets a charming younger man named Ben (Harvey Keitel). They date until Alice finds out that Ben is married; when she tries to break it off with him, he threatens to kill her. Frightened, she and Tommy flee to Tucson, Arizona, where she finds a job as a waitress at a greasy spoon called Mel's Diner, which is run by Mel Sharples (Vic Tayback).

She struggles with her new job at first, but eventually gets the hang of it with help from the cynical head waitress, Florence Jean "Flo" Castleberry (Diane Ladd). She also meets local, divorced farmer named David (Kris Kristofferson), and they fall in love. They nearly break up when they get into an argument over their future together, and over disciplining her son Tommy but David ultimately says he loves her and Tommy and wants to spend the rest of his life taking care of them. Alice decides to stay in Tucson with David, after making sure it is all right with Tommy.

References

 Burstyn, Ellen. Lessons in Becoming Myself. Penguin, 2007. 
 Cashmore, Ellis. Martin Scorsese's America. John Wiley & Sons, 2013. 
 Terrace, Vincent. Encyclopedia of Television Pilots, 1937–2012. McFarland, 2013. 
 Wernblad, Annette. The Passion of Martin Scorsese: A Critical Study of the Films. McFarland, 2010.

External links
 Alice Hyatt at the Internet Movie Database

Fictional characters from New Jersey
Fictional waiting staff
Comedy film characters
Fictional singers
Female characters in film
Film characters introduced in 1974